Club de Fútbol Pobla de Mafumet is a Spanish football club based in La Pobla de Mafumet, in the autonomous community of Catalonia. Founded in 1953, it plays in Tercera Federación – Group 5, holding home games at Estadi Municipal, which has a capacity of 1,700 spectators.

Since 2003, it has acted as a farm team for Gimnàstic de Tarragona.

History
The club was founded in the late 1940s without any official status. The club participated in friendly games and regional tournaments as a part of the local celebrations. The club existed due to the efforts of such people as Francisco Mir, Josep Padrell, Joan and Josep Canela, Jaume Álvarez, Delfí Monné, Josep Vallbé, Lluís Bové, Francesc Gassull and Josep Foix. On June 24, 1953,  the club was officially registered in the Catalan Football Federation.

Season to season

As an independent club

As a farm team

1 season in Segunda División B
13 seasons in Tercera División
2 seasons in Tercera Federación

Current squad

Notable players

For more information about players, see: CF Pobla de Mafumet footballers.

Managers

 Antonio Santamaría (1987–88)
 Romà Cunillera (1992–93)
 Santi Juncosa (1993–94)
 Ángel García (1994–95)
 Ramón Coch (1995–2000)
 José Luis Guerra (2000–01)
 Menchi (2001–02)
 José Luis Guerra (2002–03)
 Isaac Fernández (2003–04)
 Flumencio Ruiz (2004–05)
 Santi Coch (2005–10)
 Kiko Ramírez (2010–12)
 Iván Moreno (2012–14)
 Martín Posse (2014–17)
 Rodri (2017)
 Xisco Muñoz (interim) (2017)
 Edu Vílchez (interim) (2017)
 Juanma Pavón (2017–18)
 Alberto Gallego (2018–19)
 Albert Company (2019–20)
 Dani Vidal (2020–2021)
 Adolfo Baines (2021–)

References

External links
Official website 
FCF profile
Futbolme team profile 

Football clubs in Catalonia
Association football clubs established in 1953
1953 establishments in Spain
Gimnàstic de Tarragona
Spanish reserve football teams